The Viśeṣa-stava is a Buddhist stotra by the author Udbhaṭa-sidhi-svāmin and has pride of place as the text that opens the TIbetan bstan 'gyur. Originally written in Sanskrit, the hymns was extensively propagated and most people of the country recited these as songs. It was written to demonstrate the superiority of Buddhism over tirthikas. It is now only known from its Tibetan translation (in the 9th century by the efforts of Sarvajñadeva and the Tibetans Rin-chen-mchog (d. 840) and Dpal-brtseg Rakṣita). At the time of its translation into Tibetan Prajñāvarman wrote a commentary on it which immediately follows it in the Bstan 'gyur.

References 

Buddhist texts